WBKS (93.9 FM, "93.9 Kiss FM"), owned by , is a radio station serving Lima, Ohio with a Top 40 (CHR) format. Its studios are located with WIMA, WIMT-FM, WZRX-FM, and WMLX-FM on West Market Street in Lima. Its transmitter is located between Kalida and Columbus Grove, its city of license, in southern Putnam County.

History
The station was formerly known as WLWD, "Wild 93-9," until April 1, 2010. WLWD was originally a Rhythmic Contemporary station but had begun adding more mainstream pop and rock hits to its rotation in June 2009. With the change to 93-9 Kiss FM, the station has now fully transitioned to Mainstream Top 40/CHR, and now has the hit-music format to itself in Lima with former competitor station WZOQ/WWSR's change to a sports format and move from its original 92.1 frequency (now WFGF) to 93.1.

Programming
Mornings are syndicated with Elvis Duran and the Morning Show. WBKS promotes and is known for commercial free hours. Nationally syndicated Ryan Seacrest airs during the midday. DJ Old Skool holds down afternoons w/ the 5:00 Rewind, on-air 2-6p. From 6-11p it's Kennedy at night. Although the jocks and imaging are local, most of the music is programmed by Clear Channel's Premium Choice CHR format with little local changes. They run CLUB 9-3-9 on Friday & Saturday Nights. CLUB 9-3-9 kicks off early on Friday evenings at 5pm. And the studio keys are given to Matt *Matt's KISS FM official website on the weekends. He is on the air Saturday and Sundays from 10a-3p.

Call sign legacy
The WLWD calls were previously used from 1949 to 1976 by Channel 2 in Dayton, Ohio (owned by Crosley Communications, owners of the "WLW" network of stations; it is now WDTN-TV.) TV talk show host Phil Donahue, a maverick and trail blazer of TV talk shows, got his start there. The WLWD call letters were familiar in the Lima area since the WDTN signal reaches various portions of the Lima market either over the air or through cable carriage.

On April 1, 2010 WLWD changed their call letters to WBKS, to go with their "Kiss FM" branding.

External links
93.9 KISS-FM

Lima, Ohio
BKS
Contemporary hit radio stations in the United States
Radio stations established in 2003
2003 establishments in Ohio
IHeartMedia radio stations